Saidu Sharif Airport  is an airport in Pakistan. It is situated near the Swat River and between the villages of Dherai and Kanju in Khyber-Pakhtunkhwa.

The airport was built in 1978, and two flights took place daily to Peshawar. and Islamabad before the airport was shut down during the First Battle of Swat in 2007. There were hopes of reopening the airport in 2012. However, this reopening was repeatedly delayed due to the security situation. Nevertheless, after a hiatus of 17 years, the airport resumed flights from March 2021 onwards.

Many visitors that come to the valley of Swat and to the Malam Jabba ski resort in summers fly to Swat through this airport.

Airlines and destinations

See also 
 Airlines of Pakistan
 List of airports in Pakistan
 Malam Jabba
 Pakistan Civil Aviation Authority
 Swat
 Transport in Pakistan

References

External links
 Book: Hidden Treasures of Swat, 
PIA Flight Schedule

Airports in Khyber Pakhtunkhwa
Swat District
Airports established in 1978
1978 establishments in Pakistan